Aphomia is a genus of small moths belonging to the family Pyralidae. Some breed in the nests of Anthophila (bees and bumblebees), where their caterpillars are parasitic feeders of wax, honey and pollen.

Species
 Aphomia argentia Whalley, 1964
 Aphomia baryptera (Lower, 1901)
 Aphomia burellus (Holland, 1900)
 Aphomia caffralis Hampson, 1917
 Aphomia curvicostella (Zerny, 1914)
 Aphomia curvicostellus (Zerny, 1914)
 Aphomia distictella Hampson, 1917
 Aphomia erumpens (Lucas, 1898)
 Aphomia euchelliellus (Snellen, 1900)
 Aphomia foedella (Zeller, 1839)
 Aphomia fulminalis (Zeller, 1872)
 Aphomia fuscolimbella (Ragonot, 1887)
 Aphomia grisea Turati, 1913
 Aphomia homochroa (Turner, 1905)
 Aphomia isodesma (Meyrick, 1886)
 Aphomia lolotialis (Caradja, 1927)
 Aphomia melli (Caradja & Meyrick, 1933)
 Aphomia monochroa (Hampson, 1912)
 Aphomia murciella (Zerny, 1914)
 Aphomia ochracea Hampson, 1917
 Aphomia odontella (Hampson, 1898)
 Aphomia opticogramma (Meyrick, 1935)
 Aphomia pimelodes Meyrick, 1936
 Aphomia poliocyma Turner, 1937
 Aphomia pygmealis (Caradja & Meyrick, 1935)
 Aphomia sabella (Hampson in Ragonot, 1901)
 Aphomia sopozhnikovi (Krulikovsky, 1909
 Aphomia sociella (Linnaeus, 1758) – bee moth
 Aphomia spoliatrix Christoph, 1881
 Aphomia taiwanalis (Shibuya, 1928)
 Aphomia terrenella Zeller, 1848
 Aphomia unicolor (Staudinger, 1880)
 Aphomia variegatella (Hampson in Ragonot, 1901)
 Aphomia vinotincta (Hampson, 1908)
 Aphomia zelleri de Joannis, 1932

The former A. pachytera is now Heteromicta pachytera.

Footnotes

References
 

Tirathabini
Pyralidae genera